Samuel Joseph Johnson  (born 8 February 1978) is an Australian actor, radio presenter, voiceover artist and philanthropist. He is best known for his roles as Evan Wylde in the television series The Secret Life of Us for which he won the AFI award for Best Performance by an Actor in a Leading Role in a Telefeature in 2001, Leon Broznic in Rush, Toby Kirby in After the Deluge and as Molly Meldrum in the miniseries Molly for which he won the AACTA Award for Best Lead Actor in a Television Drama and won the Gold Logie for Most Popular Personality on Television of 2017. Since 2012, Johnson has led fundraising efforts for the charity Love Your Sister, which he co-founded with his sister Connie Johnson.

Starting out
Johnson was born in Daylesford, Victoria and educated at Wesley College, Melbourne. At the age of 14, he performed in his first school play, cast in a role as the mad scientist in The Pink Panther Strikes Again. On opening night he was spotted by Rhonda Schepisi, former wife of director Fred Schepisi. Taking the reins, she helped Johnson acquire an Equity Card and find auditions.
"So I figuratively got a phone call on the first night I'd ever been in a play. She marched me to the union and demanded that they give me a card, then she drove me to an agent and demanded they take me on. It was somewhat fortuitous and I happened to get the first 20 or so jobs I went for. This career was certainly not designed by me."

Career

Television 

Johnson's first foray into television started with small roles in various shows including the role of Prince Jobah in The New Adventures of Ocean Girl; as Sally Fletcher's first boyfriend, Gus Bishop, in Home and Away; and in other bit parts including Blue Heelers, Halifax f.p., Stingers and Something in the Air.

His break, however, came in 2001 when he was chosen for the role of the scruffy, womanising writer Evan Wylde in Channel 10's drama series The Secret Life of Us. Evan was a main character, also narrating the majority of the show (apart from instances narrated by Deborah Mailman's character Kelly Lewis). This made Johnson a household name and earned him an AFI Award in 2001 for Best Actor in a Leading Role in a Television Drama Series.

The Secret Life of Us enjoyed consistent success up until the third series, when many major characters left, resulting in a drop in ratings. Johnson's character Evan (one of the last three original major characters alongside Kelly Lewis and Simon Trader) left early in the fourth series in 2004 and the show was axed soon afterwards.

In 2003, during the height of Johnson's Secret Life career, he received rave reviews for his performance in the mini-series After the Deluge. It follows the story of the Kirby family; their father Cliff is in the advanced stages of Alzheimer's disease, and relives his disturbing memories of the war and his first love, as a part of his experiences of the present. His three estranged sons Alex (David Wenham), Marty (Hugo Weaving) and Toby (Johnson) are thrown together to care for their father whilst struggling with their own lives and relationships and attempting to come to terms with their father's mental state.

Apart from Johnson's appearances on many Australian shows to promote his work, he has also featured on Thank God You're Here and The Panel as well as the ABC documentary The Sum of Sam; documenting his personal struggles and work with Open Family Australia, a youth outreach program co-founded by South Melbourne parish priest Fr Bob Maguire.

Johnson appeared in the police drama Rush in Melbourne, a drama revolving around Melbourne's Tactical Response team (based on Critical Incident Response-style teams). He played the role of communications specialist Leon Broznic; alongside Callan Mulvey and Catherine McClements who played Evan's girlfriend Carmen in The Secret Life of Us.

In 2010, he made a cameo appearance as an old friend of Sarah's in the final episode of Wilfred.

In 2016, Johnson starred as Molly Meldrum in the miniseries Molly.

In 2019, he competed and won the 16th season of Network 10's Dancing with the Stars, with professional partner Jorja Freeman, and raised $50,000 in prize money for his charity Love Your Sister.

Film 

Johnson's first film role was in the 1995 film Angel Baby where he played Check-Out Cashier. Angel Baby was the tale of two people suffering from schizophrenia who meet at therapy and fall in love. The film was a huge success, sweeping the board at the 1995 AFI Awards.

Johnson is also well known for his role in the 2002 Mick Molloy film Crackerjack. Playing Molloy's slacker pothead flatmate Dave Jackson, the film enjoyed relative success winning a host of awards including Outstanding Comic Screenplay and Outstanding Film Comedy at the Australian Comedy Awards in 2003.

After leaving The Secret Life of Us in 2004, Johnson went on to star in the dark, black comedy The Illustrated Family Doctor as Gary Kelp, a man condensing The Illustrated Family Doctor medical guide. Unfulfilled in every way, Gary starts to develop the physical symptoms of the ills he is transcribing and his life begins to really fall apart. The film divided viewers and critics, with the film resulting in a love-it-or-hate-it divide and was nominated for a handful of awards including Best Adapted Screenplay at the 2005 AFI Awards.

Voice-overs and commercials 

Johnson provided a voice-over for Vodafone, also appearing in their advertisements. Early in his career, Johnson also lent his voice to commercials for Hungry Jack's, as well as a number of other brands.

Radio 

In 2005/06, Johnson joined Nova 100, hosting the 9am – 12pm slot. He was popular in the role but resigned mid-2006, several months after his girlfriend Lainie Woodlands died.

Theatre 
In July 2007, he appeared on stage playing a young Weary Dunlop in the play "Weary: The Story of Sir Edward Dunlop". Weary follows the ageing veteran after retirement, when he returns to the diaries of his time in a World War II POW camp. The action switches between the young Weary and his older, wiser self.

Johnson's other stage credits include:
 Love Letters – Andrew Makepeace Ladd III
 Hotel Sorrento – The Son
 The Present – Danny Rule
 The Snake Pit – Harry
 Mad Woman’s Fountain – Harry
 Life During War Time – Howard
 The Pink Panther Strikes Again – Dreyfus

Personal life
Born in 1978, Johnson was born and raised in Daylesford, Victoria. He had two sisters, Constance and Hilde, both raised by their father. When Johnson was a toddler, his mother died by suicide. At age 11, his sister Connie was diagnosed with cancer, after a tumour was discovered in her leg. She died in September, 2017 of terminal breast cancer.

Prior to his discovery, his family were going through some financial difficulty. His father had enough money to pay for one of them to go to a private school for a term. "He chose me despite the fact that my sister had a better academic record. And by the end of the first term, I was earning enough to pay for the school fees that we couldn't afford. I was very lucky. I got an opportunity and I made the most of it." With the money he earned through his acting, they were able to pay off the school fees and eventually started their own family business, a chain of second-hand bookstores around Melbourne.

On 5 February 2006, his girlfriend Lainie Woodlands took her own life. Johnson and Woodlands' mother Kim then endured a bitter legal tug-of-war for two months with Lainie's estranged father to bury her close to her chosen home and those she loved. She was eventually buried by Johnson, Kim, Lainie's siblings and many close friends. Johnson took an extended career break to recover from the trauma and returned to Daylesford.

In late 2007, he began a relationship with Sarah Hallam, a casting director. They have known each other since they were 15. He stated, "I am really enjoying my new life. It is very different from the other one ... out in the 'burbs with my girl and her little boy, who is five." They live in the outer suburbs of Melbourne with Hallam's young son, while running workshops for aspiring actors.

In September 2007, he was involved in a bar brawl at Star City Casino in Sydney. While attending a wedding with his girlfriend Hallam, he was involved in an altercation with another guest, Ben Benson. Johnson had repeatedly punched Benson before stomping on his head as he lay prone on the floor. The court was told that at the time of the offence Johnson was receiving treatment for depression following the suicide of his long-term partner Lainie Woodlands. Upon leaving the court, Johnson was completely remorseful for his actions, stating, "I am very sorry it all happened, I was a bit of a nincompoop and I'm glad that it's all over. I'm looking forward to moving on". He was given a 12-month good behaviour bond, with Johnson to continue with his counselling, and no conviction was recorded.

In May 2008, Johnson gave his first interview since the death of Woodlands to ABC Television's Australian Story – The Sum of Sam. He talked about the turmoil of the last three years – and his life changing involvement with Open Family Australia, a charity that works with vulnerable young people.

As of mid-2019, Johnson was living in his birthplace of Daylesford, near Melbourne.

In January 2023, Johnson revealed his personal rift with Molly Meldrum, whom he portrayed in the miniseries Molly and had known personally for 20 years. The rift began when Meldrum hijacked Johnson's speech at the 2017 Logie Awards, which Johnson intended to use to call attention to the Love Your Sister charity.

Fundraising
In 2003, Johnson rode from Sydney to Melbourne on a unicycle to raise money for children's cancer charity Canteen.

On New Years Day 2012, he and his sister, Connie Johnson, started the Love Your Sister charity, which supports the Garvan Institute of Medical Research.

In 2013, Johnson began riding 15,000 km on a unicycle in a year-long attempt to break the Guinness World Record and raise $1 million for the Garvan Institute of Medical Research to find a cure for breast cancer. His stated mission is to remind every Australian woman about the need to be 'breast aware', in an effort to promote early detection and improve survival rates, via his charitable foundation, Love Your Sister.

On 14 February 2014, Johnson returned to the starting point of his journey, Melbourne's Federation Square, having travelled 15,955 km by unicycle, broken the world record for the longest unicycle journey and raised $1,477,630. In 2016, Johnson was awarded the Medal of the Order of Australia (OAM) for service to cancer research support organisations, and to the performing arts.

On 24 August 2019, Love Your Sister reached their initial goal of $10,000,000 raised.

Awards
 Medal of the Order of Australia (OAM) for service to cancer research support organisations and to the performing arts.
 Victorian Candidate for Australian of the Year 2018 for cancer support work.
 2017 TV Week Gold Logie.

References

External links
 
 Samuel Johnson's charitable foundation: loveyoursister.org

1978 births
Living people
AACTA Award winners
Australian male voice actors
Australian male television actors
Australian radio personalities
Australian philanthropists
People educated at Wesley College (Victoria)
People from Daylesford, Victoria
Gold Logie winners